The common name citrus yellow mite may refer to any of the following species:
Eotetranychus cendanai (Tetranychidae)
Eotetranychus kankitus (Tetranychidae)
Lorryia formosa (Tydeidae)

Animal common name disambiguation pages